Chris Lockwood may refer to:

Chris Lockwood, drummer for Super Deluxe (band)
Chris Lockwood, character in 40 Pounds of Trouble